Isoteinon lamprospilus is a species of skipper butterfly in the family Hesperiidae. It is found in China and Japan.

References
Natural History Museum Lepidoptera genus database

External links
Tree of life

Hesperiinae